Gregorio Gracia Sánchez (born 15 May 2002), commonly known as Gori, is a Spanish footballer who plays as a midfielder for RCD Espanyol B.

Club career
Born in Arenys de Munt, Barcelona, Catalonia, Gori joined RCD Espanyol's youth setup in 2015, after representing CF Damm and FPEF Calella. He made his senior debut with the reserves on 23 October 2020, coming on as a late substitute in a 2–2 Segunda División B away draw against FC Andorra.

Gori scored his first senior goal on 21 February 2021, netting the equalizer for the B's in a 1–1 home draw against UE Llagostera. On 5 August 2021, he renewed his contract with the Pericos.

Gori made his first team – and La Liga – debut on 14 August 2021, replacing fellow youth graduate David López in a 0–0 away draw against CA Osasuna.

References

External links

2002 births
Living people
People from Maresme
Sportspeople from the Province of Barcelona
Spanish footballers
Footballers from Catalonia
Association football midfielders
La Liga players
Segunda División B players
Segunda Federación players
RCD Espanyol B footballers
RCD Espanyol footballers
Spain youth international footballers
CF Damm players